The Uganda Green Party is a green political party in Uganda. The party claims to be committed to the well-being of the natural environment rather than to politics. Its main objective is to protect the environment and its habitats.

See also

Conservation movement
Environmental movement
Green politics
List of environmental organizations
Sustainability
Sustainable development

External links
Political parties registered with the Electoral Commission of Uganda

Green parties in Africa
Political parties in Uganda